The Tremors franchise consists of a series of American monster comedy-horror films and a spin-off television show, with a plot centered around attacks from subterranean worm-like creatures known as Graboids. It began in 1990 with the release of Tremors, which spawned a series of direct-to-video films and the titular television series. In 2017, a second television series was ordered to air on Syfy, and a pilot was shot, but the project was ultimately cancelled.

Films

Tremors (1990)

Tremors is a 1990 American monster film directed by Ron Underwood, with a screenplay by S. S. Wilson and Brent Maddock, starring Kevin Bacon, Fred Ward, Finn Carter, Michael Gross and Reba McEntire. It was distributed by Universal Pictures.

Tremors 2: Aftershocks (1996)

Tremors 2: Aftershocks is a 1996 action-horror sequel to Tremors, in which the character of Earl Bassett, returning from the first movie, is hired to deal with a subterranean "Graboid" infestation at a Mexican oilfield. It was directed by S. S. Wilson, and stars Fred Ward, Christopher Gartin, Michael Gross and Helen Shaver. It introduced a new creature called the Shriekers.

Tremors 3: Back to Perfection (2001)

Tremors 3: Back to Perfection is a 2001 comedic monster film, the third in the "Tremors" series featuring the subterranean worm-creatures dubbed "Graboids". It was directed by Brent Maddock and stars Michael Gross. Like the second movie, the film was not released in theaters. It introduced a new creature called the Ass-Blasters.

Tremors 4: The Legend Begins (2004)

Tremors 4: The Legend Begins is a 2004 direct-to-video movie. It is the fourth film in the "Tremors" series of monster films. It is a prequel to the earlier movies and featured Michael Gross as the ancestor to his original character in the first Tremors film.

Tremors 5: Bloodlines (2015)

Tremors 5: Bloodlines was produced in South Africa, featuring a returning Michael Gross and new co-star Jamie Kennedy. It also stars Natalie Becker.  The film was released on Blu-ray, DVD and Digital HD on October 6, 2015. Though it is based on a script written by Brent Maddock and S. S. Wilson in 2004, the original creators declined to be involved due to a lack of creative control over the project. It received mixed reviews.

Tremors: A Cold Day in Hell (2018)

On September 20, 2016, Michael Gross announced on his official Facebook page that a sixth film was in development. Tremors 5 co-star Jamie Kennedy returned, along with director Don Michael Paul. Filming commenced in late January 2017. The film was released on DVD and Blu-ray in May 2018.

Tremors: Shrieker Island (2020)

On December 13, 2018, Michael Gross confirmed that Universal had ordered a seventh entry in the series and that he would return to star, stating "Tremors fans will be delighted to know I have just agreed to the terms of a contract for a seventh film. My best estimate is that Burt Gummer will begin his hunt for Graboids and other nefarious forms of wildlife in the fall of 2019." On November 13, 2019, filming began in Thailand. On November 26, 2019, Jon Heder, Jackie Cruz, and Richard Brake signed on to star alongside Gross. On December 12, 2019, Gross confirmed that filming had wrapped. In August 2020, the film was known under the working title Island Fury until it was officially titled Tremors: Shrieker Island. The film was released direct-to-video on October 20, 2020.

Future 
In a podcast with Bloody Disgusting, Gross mentioned that "part of me that feels that Universal Home Entertainment might've had enough of Tremors", though he followed up by saying "The door is still open for an eighth Tremors. It may seem unlikely by what people see on the screen, but it is possible. There could be an eighth. And if there were, and if it were an interesting story, I would be up for it because Burt is always a great deal of fun. It would depend on his physicality. How much they want me to do. If it's in another two years, I'll be 75 years old. So I will continue to hope and pray that I stay in shape, to do what is asked of me – if it is asked of me." Gross later said on Facebook "There are no guarantees, but for those who wonder aloud if this is the final film, I will say what I have said before: SALES drive sequels. Show biz is 5% show and 95% business, so if this latest addition to the Tremors franchise, sells well, Universal Studios Hollywood will follow the money, and Universal Pictures Home Entertainment may will [sic] be back for more."

Television

Tremors (2003)

Tremors is a television spin-off of the Tremors franchise which originally ran on Syfy, with one half-season of 13 episodes aired before being cancelled.

Cast and crew

Principal cast

Additional crew

Production

Attraction

While only the first film was filmed in Lone Pine, California, there is an exhibit dedicated to Tremors in the Lone Pine Film History Museum. The exhibit contains film props such as the Graboid head used to burst through the ground, a miniature of Chang's Market used in Tremors 4: The Legend Begins, and a mount of a Graboid used in Tremors 2: Aftershocks.

Reception

Academy of Science Fiction, Fantasy & Horror Films, USA Awards

Young Artist Awards

DVD Exclusive Awards

Motion Picture Sound Editors, USA Awards

Other media

Video games
Dirt Dragons is a browser game tie-in to the 2004 film Tremors 4: The Legend Begins.

In 2010, Newgrounds released Tremerz, an online 8-bit video game adaptation of the original Tremors film.

Universal Movie Tycoon is a sim-city-building game released in 2012 for iOS, developed by Fuse Powered Inc. and published by Bytemark Games, that featured the Tremors film.

Cancelled projects

A Tremors: The Game video game based on the franchise was announced in August 2002 by Rock Solid Studios. It was scheduled for release during the fall of 2003. However, the game was quietly cancelled in the summer of that year.

During the production of Tremors 2: Aftershocks, a television series titled Tremors 2: Aftershocks – The Lost Monsters! was being developed by Universal Television and Stampede Entertainment. According to Stampede, "[the] series premise was that, after their success in fighting the Graboids, Val and Earl would be sought out by the readers of tabloid newspapers, believers in UFOs, etc. to battle other little-known creatures".

On November 28, 2015, it was reported that Universal Television and Blumhouse Productions were developing a new Tremors TV series and that Kevin Bacon would reprise his role of Valentine McKee for the first time in the series since the first film. In September 2016, it was announced the series was moving forward at Amazon Prime Video, however, in June 2017, the pilot was moved to Syfy. In August 2017, it was announced that Vincenzo Natali would direct the pilot which would be written by showrunner Andrew Miller with filming taking place from late October 2017 through November 2017. On April 28, 2018, it was announced that Syfy had passed on the pilot.

References

Film series introduced in 1990
Horror film franchises
Science fiction film franchises